Takahashia japonica - the string cottony scale - is an insect pest of ornamental- and economic trees in the Coccidae family. It is a pest of quarantine significance in the EPPO area.

Range

Invasive range
First detected in Italy, in Cerro Maggiore, in 2017 on Morus nigra, and the United Kingdom in December 2018 in Berkshire on Magnolia. T. japonica was then found in Croatia in 2019 in Pula, but was not identified until found again on Albizia julibrissin in May of 2020.

References

Takahashia
Agricultural pest insects
Insect pests of ornamental plants